So Nem is the former minister for national education of Cambodia. He was the joint founder with Chau Sengof of La Nouvelle Dèpêche (The New Dispatch) newspaper in the 1960s. He was a member of the national assembly.

See also
 Bun Chanmol

References

External links
https://www.jstor.org/stable/2642515

Living people
Year of birth missing (living people)
Cambodian politicians
Education ministers
Newspaper founders
Government ministers of Cambodia